Woodbourne Heights, Baltimore is a community in northern Baltimore, Maryland. It is served by the Woodbourne Heights Community, the Woodbourne-McCabe Neighborhood and the Beauregard Neighborhood Associations.

Points of interest
Woodbourne Heights, Baltimore includes several historically and culturally significant places of interest including: Chinquapin Park, the McCabe Mansion, the Belvedere Square Shopping Centers and City Garden plots on Woodbourne Avenue.

Demographics
According to the 2000 US Census, 2,880 people live in Woodbourne Heights/Woodbourne McCabe, Baltimore with 92% African-American and 5% White. The median family income is $40,948. 85% of the houses are occupied and about 50% of those are occupied by the home's owner.

Schools
Woodbourne Heights, Baltimore has three public elementary schools:  Yorkwood and Leithwalk elementary schools.  The area is served by the Chinquapin Middle School. High school students generally attend Mervo, City, DuBois or Lewis high schools.

Notes

 

Neighborhoods in Baltimore
Northern Baltimore